The enzyme phaseollidin hydratase catalyzes the chemical reaction

phaseollidin hydrate  phaseollidin + H2O

This enzyme belongs to the family of lyases, specifically the hydro-lyases, which cleave carbon-oxygen bonds.  The systematic name of this enzyme class is phaseollidin-hydrate hydro-lyase (phaseollidin-forming). This enzyme is also called phaseollidin-hydrate hydro-lyase.

References

 

EC 4.2.1
Enzymes of unknown structure